Vojtech Masný (born 8 July 1938) is a former Slovak football player.

In Czechoslovak First League he appeared in 243 league matches and scored 71 goals.
He played 9 matches and scored 3 goals for Czechoslovakia national football team.
Masný also participated in the 1964 Summer Olympics in Tokyo, where Czechoslovakia won the silver medals. His younger brother Marián Masný represented Czechoslovakia as well.

External links
 Profile at ČMFS website

1938 births
Living people
Slovak footballers
Czechoslovak footballers
Czechoslovakia international footballers
Olympic footballers of Czechoslovakia
Olympic silver medalists for Czechoslovakia
Olympic medalists in football
Footballers at the 1964 Summer Olympics
Medalists at the 1964 Summer Olympics
TTS Trenčín players
Czechoslovak expatriate footballers
Czechoslovak expatriate sportspeople in Austria
Expatriate footballers in Austria
Association football forwards
People from Partizánske District
Sportspeople from the Trenčín Region
First Vienna FC players